The 1962–63 Copa del Generalísimo was the 61st staging of the Copa del Rey (King's Cup). The competition began on 25 November 1962 and ended on 24 June 1963 with the final.

First round

|}
Tiebreaker

|}
Second tiebreaker

|}

Round of 32

|}
Tiebreaker

|}

Round of 16

|}
Tiebreaker

|}

Quarter-finals

|}
Tiebreaker

|}

Semi-finals

|}
Tiebreaker

|}

Final

|}

External links
 rsssf.com
 linguasport.com

{spancup1963.html rsssf.com]
 linguasport.com

Copa del Rey seasons
Copa del Rey
Copa